Control-Y is a common computer command. It is generated by holding  and pressing the  key on most computer keyboards.

In most Windows applications this keyboard shortcut functions as Redo, reversing a previous Undo. In some programs such as Microsoft Office it repeats the previous action if it was something other than Undo.

Apple Macintosh systems use  for Redo. In general a shortcut on Macintosh using  matches up with a shortcut on Windows using , this is one of the most noticeable conflicts. But quite a few remain where only one or the other shortcut works.

Other uses 

The OpenVMS operating system command-line uses  as its "abort" character, stronger in effect than the ordinary  "interrupt" character.

 deleted the current line in the WordStar word processor for CP/M and MS-DOS. In the 1980s, many text editors and word processors mimicked the WordStar command set, making  a common synonym for "delete line."

In Borland IDEs it also deletes the current line.

In emacs it does a paste action (known as "yank"). Emacs uses  for Undo and Redo.

In vi and vim it scrolls the display up one line.

In the pico and nano text editors this shortcut scrolls one page up.

In SAP GUI it enters block-select mode.

See also
 Undo / redo
 Cut, copy, and paste
 Ctrl-Z

References

Computer keys